Holgate Brewhouse is a small, independent, family-owned brewery in Woodend, Victoria, Australia. The brewery operations began in 1999 and were moved to the Keatings Hotel in 2005, where the Brewhouse also operates a restaurant and hotel.  Holgate beers are available in bottles and on tap throughout the Melbourne area.

Their beers have consistently won accolades at the Australian International Beer Awards, including gold medals for the Mt Macedon Ale and Pilsner, as well as the 2008 Premier's Trophy for Best Victorian Beer for the Big Reg Lager.

See also 

 List of breweries in Australia

References

External links 
  - includes profiles of each beer
Tourism Victoria profile

Australian beer brands
1999 establishments in Australia
Food and drink companies established in 1999
Beer brewing companies based in Victoria (Australia)